Limb–girdle muscular dystrophy (LGMD) is a genetically heterogeneous group of rare muscular dystrophies that share a set of clinical characteristics. It is characterised by progressive muscle wasting which affects predominantly hip and shoulder muscles. LGMD usually has an autosomal pattern of inheritance. It currently has no known cure or treatment.

Signs and symptoms
By definition, all limb girdle muscular dystrophies (LGMD) cause progressive proximal weakness, meaning weakness of the muscles on or close to the torso that worsens over time. Explicitly, LGMD preferentially affects muscles of the hip girdle, thigh, shoulder girdle, and/or upper arm. The muscle weakness is generally symmetric. Usually, the hip girdle is the first area to exhibit weakness, manifesting as difficulty walking, going up and/or down stairs, rising from a chair, bending at the waist, or squatting. Because of these difficulties, falling can occur frequently. Weakness of the shoulder girdle can make lifting objects, or even elevating the arms, difficult or impossible. Rate of progression varies between patients. Eventually, the abilities to run and walk can deteriorate. The disease commonly leads to dependence on a wheelchair within years of symptom onset, although some patients maintain mobility. Eventually the disease can affect other muscles such as the ones located in the face.

By definition, LGMDs primarily affect skeletal muscles, although cardiac muscle can be affected to a lesser degree in select subtypes, which can cause palpitations

There can be significant variability in disease features and severity between LGMD subtypes, and even within any given LGMD subtype. Additional possible presentations include:

In most cases, pain is not present with LGMD, and mental function is not affected. LGMD can begin in childhood, adolescence, young adulthood or even later, the age of onset is usually between 10 and 30. Both genders are affected equally. When limb-girdle muscular dystrophy begins in childhood, the progression appears to be faster and the disease more disabling. When the disorder begins in adolescence or adulthood the disease is generally not as severe and progresses more slowly. There is no sensory neuropathy or autonomic or visceral dysfunction at presentation.

Genetics

LGMD is a genetic and heritable disorder, due to one of many genetic mutations of proteins involved in muscle function. All currently identified LGMDs have an inheritance pattern that is dominant or recessive, although the definition of LGMD allows for diseases with more complicated inheritance patterns to be classified as LGMD. Pathogenic mutations are mostly in coding regions, but non-coding causative variants were also reported. In Euroasia CAPN3 mutations are the most common cause of LGMD, however in northern Europe mutations in FKRP are also very common.

Diagnosis
The diagnosis of limb–girdle muscular dystrophy can be done via muscle biopsy, which will show the presence of muscular dystrophy, and genetic testing is used to determine which type of muscular dystrophy a patient has. Immunohistochemical dystrophin tests can indicate a decrease in dystrophin detected in sarcoglycanopathies. In terms of sarcoglycan deficiency there can be variance (if α-sarcoglycan and γ-sarcoglycan are not present then there's a mutation in LGMD2D).

The 2014 Evidence-based guideline summary: Diagnosis and treatment of limb–girdle and distal dystrophies indicates that individuals suspected of having the inherited disorder should have genetic testing. Other tests/analysis are:
 High CK levels(x10-150 times normal)
 MRI can indicate different types of LGMD.
 EMG can confirm the myopathic characteristic of the disease.
 Electrocardiography (cardiac arrhythmias in LGMD1B can occur)

Types

The "LGMD D" family is autosomal dominant, and the "LGMD R" family is autosomal recessive. Limb–girdle muscular dystrophy is explained in terms of gene, locus, OMIM and type as follows:

LGMD criteria
For a disease entity to be classified as an LGMD, the following criteria must be met:
 genetic, with an identifiable inheritance pattern such as autosomal dominant, autosomal recessive, digenic, or polygenic.
 relatively selective to skeletal muscle
 predominantly proximal muscle involvement
 independent walking is achieved at one point in life
 elevated serum creatine kinase
 muscle fiber loss
 dystrophic changes in muscle histology
 degenerative changes on medical imaging
 end-stage pathology seen in the most affected muscles
 described in at least two unrelated families

Differential
Many diseases can manifest similarly to LGMD. Dystrophinopathies, including Duchenne muscular dystrophy, Becker muscular dystrophy, and manifesting dystrophinopathy in female carriers, can present similarly to LGMD. Facioscapulohumeral muscular dystrophy can appear similarly, especially when it spares the facial muscles. Also in the differential are Emery-Dreifuss muscular dystrophies, Pompe disease, later-onset congenital myasthenic syndromes, and proximal-predominant hereditary motor neuropathies.

Treatment

There are few studies corroborating the effectiveness of exercise for limb–girdle muscular dystrophy. However studies have shown that exercise can, in fact, damage muscles permanently due to intense muscle contraction. Physical therapy may be required to maintain as much muscle strength and joint flexibility as possible. Calipers may be used to maintain mobility and quality of life. Careful attention to lung and heart health is required, corticosteroids in LGMD 2C-F individuals, shows some improvement. Additionally individuals can follow management that follows:
 Occupational therapy
 Respiratory therapy
 Speech therapy
 Neutralizing antibody to myostatin should not be pursued

The sarcoglycanopathies could be possibly amenable to gene therapy.

Prognosis
In terms of the prognosis of limb–girdle muscular dystrophy in its mildest form, affected individuals have near-normal muscle strength and function. LGMD isn't typically a fatal disease, though it may eventually weaken the heart and respiratory muscles, leading to illness or death due to secondary disorders.

Epidemiology
The minimum prevalence of limb–girdle muscular dystrophy, as a group, likely ranges from 2.27-10 per 100,000 (1:44,000 to 1:10,000). LGMD is the fourth most common muscular dystrophy, after the dystrophinopathies, myotonic dystrophies, and facioscapulohumeral muscular dystrophy. The prevalence of individual LGMDs, as studied in the United States, in descending order, are those due to mutation of 1) calpain, 2) dysferlin, 3) collagen VI, 4) sarcoglycans, 5) anoctamin 5, and 6) fukutin-related protein. In Euroasia CAPN3 mutations are the most common cause of LGMD, however in northern Europe mutations in FKRP are also very common. It is difficult to calculate the worldwide prevalence of even the most common LGMD types, due to the founder effect causing varying prevalence by region. The less common types are very rare, often only described is limited regions of the world.

History
The term 'limb girdle muscular dystrophy' was published in 1954, describing a group of heterogeneous conditions that clinicians noticed to be distinct from Duchenne muscular dystrophy, facioscapulohumeral muscular dystrophy, and myotonic dystrophy. The genetics of LGMDs began to be understood in the late 1900s, which led the European Neuromuscular Centre (ENMC) to establish a consensus on classification of LGMDs in 1995. The classification scheme at that time denoted autosomal dominant LGMDs as 'LGMD1' and autosomal recessive LGMDs as 'LGMD2.' A letter was appended to the names of LGMDs according to the order of discovery of the causal genetic mutation. As LGMD2Z was established, the question arose of what letter to assign the next discovered LGMD2. With this issue, among other motives, the ENMC established a new consensus on the classification and definition of LGMD in 2017. With the new definition, several diseases were removed from the LGMD category:

Research

There is a variety of research under way targeted at various forms of limb–girdle muscular dystrophy. Among the treatments thought to hold promise is gene therapy, which is the delivery of genetic material, often a copy of a healthy gene, into cells.

According to a review by Bengtsson et al. some success with AAV-mediated gene therapies (for different disorders) have increased interest in researchers, with CRISPR/Cas9 and exon-skipping helping these therapeutic goals along. Limb–girdle muscular dystrophies have many different types which are due to different gene mutations. LGMD2D is caused by a mutation in the α-sarcoglycan gene. Future treatment could be had by gene therapy through recombinant adeno-associated vectors.

According to a review by Straub, et al., there are several research issues that need to be addressed: the rareness of the disease, poor understanding of the mechanism of LGMD R, and absence of patient cohorts, all contributing to lack of biomarkers for LGMD. The review goes on to state that animal models for LGMD R have been used to analyze therapeutic medications. Also, although prednisone has been used and has had positive effects on affected LGMD2 individuals, there is still no evidence of its effectiveness in trials that are placebo-controlled.

See also
 Muscle atrophy

References

Further reading

External links 

Muscular dystrophy